The Cabinet of Tuvalu is the executive branch of the government of Tuvalu.

It is drawn from, and responsible to, the legislative branch, the unicameral Parliament of Tuvalu. After every legislative election, members of parliament (MPs) elect one of their own as prime minister. The latter then appoints ministers from among the MPs to form a cabinet. (Officially, ministers are appointed by the Governor-General of Tuvalu, who represents the monarch, with the governor-general acting on the advice of the prime minister). Initially, the Constitution provided that the number of members of cabinet (excluding the prime minister) must not be more than one third of the number of members of parliament. This was amended by the Constitution of Tuvalu (Amendment) Act 2007, which provides that up to half of the members of parliament may be appointed to cabinet (in addition to the prime minister). As there are no political parties in Tuvalu, and MPs are independent members representing the interest of their constituency, the prime minister is usually careful to appoint MPs from different parts of the country as cabinet members. There are currently 16 MPs.

The Constitution of Tuvalu states that the cabinet is responsible to parliament. The latter may dismiss it through a vote of no confidence.

Current Cabinet

Following the 2019 Tuvaluan general election, on 19 September 2019, the members of parliament elected Kausea Natano from Funafuti as Prime Minister, and Samuelu Teo was elected as Speaker of the Parliament of Tuvalu. 

Mrs. Teniku Talesi Honolulu, the acting Governor-General of Tuvalu convened the Parliament of Tuvalu to meet on 19 September 2019, at which Kausea Natano was elected as Prime Minister of Tuvalu. Natano appointed the members of the Cabinet, which met for the first time on 20 September 2019.

Sopoaga Cabinet (2013-2019)

On 1 August 2013, Governor-General of Tuvalu Sir Iakoba Italeli made an unprecedented use of his reserve powers in removing prime minister Willy Telavi from office and appointed opposition leader Enele Sopoaga as interim prime minister. On 4 August 2013, Sopoaga was elected as prime minister by 8 votes to 5. He was sworn in and appointed his ministers to the cabinet a day later.

The 2015 Tuvaluan general election was held on 31 March. Vete Sakaio, the deputy prime minister and minister for public utilities, was not re-elected to parliament.

Enele Sopoaga was sworn in as prime minister and appointed the ministers to the cabinet on 10 April.

Cabinets 2010-2013

Telavi Cabinet (2010–2013)

The government led by Maatia Toafa remained in office for 3 months. In December 2010, Willy Telavi, minister for home affairs in the Toafa Ministry, crossed the floor, joined the opposition and enabled it to bring down the Toafa's government through a vote of no confidence, which was carried by eight votes to seven. On 24 December, Telavi was elected as the Prime Minister, defeating Environment Minister Enele Sopoaga (who was supported by Maatia Toafa) by another 8–7 vote. Telavi appointed his cabinet on that same day, Christmas Eve.

Isaia Italeli, minister for works and natural resources, died suddenly on 19 July 2011, while attending a regional meeting in Apia, Samoa. In August, his widow, Pelenike Isaia, was elected to his seat in parliament in a by-election in the constituency of Nui, thereby saving the government's parliamentary majority. She was subsequently appointed to cabinet as minister for home affairs. She is the second woman in parliament, and in cabinet, in Tuvalu's history.

On 21 December 2012, finance minister Lotoala Metia died in hospital, of unspecified causes. The by-election caused by his death would decide the future of the Telavi government, reduced by his death (once again) to a parity of seven seats apiece with the opposition in parliament. The government succeeded in postponing it until 28 June, whereupon it was won by the opposition candidate Elisala Pita, with two-thirds of the vote.

On 30 July 2013, as the government was about to face a motion of no confidence, health minister Taom Tanukale unexpectedly resigned from Parliament (and thus also from the government) altogether. As a consequence of the death of Metia, education minister Falesa Pitoi being ill and outside the country since December 2012, and Tanukale having resigned, Telavi was left with only three active government ministers other than himself: deputy prime minister Kausea Natano, foreign affairs minister Apisai Ielemia, and home affairs minister Pelenike Isaia; he also had the support of the speaker. (There were no government backbenchers.) The following day, the reason for Tanukale's resignation became apparent. The speaker, Sir Kamuta Latasi, rejected the opposition's attempt to table a motion of no confidence, on the grounds that there was now a vacant seat in parliament. Latasi adjourned parliament, and ruled that it would not reconvene until a by-election had been held - thus prolonging Telavi's minority government once more. However, a day later on 1 August 2013, the governor-general and head of state, Sir Iakoba Italeli, sent out a proclamation removing Telavi from office as prime minister, and appointing opposition leader Enele Sopoaga as interim prime minister. Telavi had reportedly announced his intention of removing Italeli as governor-general. Opposition spokesman Taukelina Finikaso praised Italeli for having "uph[e]ld the constitution", since Telavi had lacked a parliamentary majority with which to govern.

His cabinet lasted officially until 2 August 2013, when it was formally voted out of office by the opposition.

2nd Toafa Cabinet (2010)

This short-lived cabinet was appointed by prime minister Maatia Toafa on 29 September 2010, following the general election on 16 September. It included a number of first time MPs, who had supported Toafa in his bid for the premiership. Sopoaga's appointment as minister for foreign affairs was described as a clear sign of the importance the government placed on climate change issues within its foreign policy.

Cabinet 2006-2010

Ielemia Cabinet (2006–2010)

Following the 2006 general election Apisai Ielemia was elected as prime minister. His cabinet consisted of the following members: Ielemia continued as prime minister until the 2010 Tuvaluan general election.

Cabinets 2002-2006

1st Toafa Cabinet (2004–2006)
Maatia Toafa succeeded Saufatu Sopoanga as prime minister. Sopoanga resigned from parliament on 27 August 2004, after his government was deposed in a vote of no confidence. Toafa, who was deputy prime minister at the time, became acting prime minister.  A by-election was held on 7 October 2004 and Saufatu Sopoanga regained his seat. Maatia Toafa was elected prime minister on 11 October 2004 with a vote of 8:7. Toafa remained prime minister until the 2006 Tuvaluan general election.
The members of cabinet included:

Sopoanga Cabinet (2002–2004)

Following the 202 general election, on 2 August 2002 Saufatu Sopoanga, who had been minister of finance in the previous administration, was elected prime minister. The deputy prime minister was Maatia Toafa and Bikenibeu Paeniu was the minister of finance. Sopoanga resigned from parliament on 27 August 2004, after his government was deposed in a vote of no confidence. 

The members of the cabinet were:

Cabinets 1998-2002

Talake Cabinet (2001–2002)
Koloa Talake became prime minister on 14 December 2001, after his predecessor Faimalaga Luka had been ousted by parliament in a motion of no confidence. This was Talake's cabinet just prior to the July 2002 general election, in which Talake lost his seat in parliament:

Luka Cabinet (2001)
Faimalaga Luka became the prime minister on 24 February 2001 until he was replaced by Koloa Talake after a vote of no confidence on 14 December 2001.
Cabinet to be added

Tuilimu Cabinet (2000-2001)
Lagitupu Tuilimu was acting prime minister from 8 December 2000 to 24 February 2001. he was appointed following the death of Ionatana Ionatana on 8 December 2000. The members of the cabinet were:

Ionatana Cabinet (1999-2000)
Ionatana Ionatana was elected as prime minister following the resignation of Bikenibeu Paeniu following a vote of no confidence on 27 April 1999. Ionatana Ionatana died on 8 December 2000.
Lagitupu Tuilimu was appointed the minister of finance (1999–2001).
Cabinet to be added

3rd Paeniu Cabinet (1998-1999)

Following the 1998 general election, Bikenibeu Paeniu was re-elected prime minister on 8 April 1998; He appointed his cabinet on the same day. Bikenibeu Paeniu remained as prime minister until he resigned following a vote of no confidence on 27 April 1999.

Cabinets 1993-1998

2nd Paeniu Cabinet (1996-1998)
Bikenibeu Paeniu was elected as prime minister for the second time following the resignation of Kamuta Latasi as the result of a vote of no confidence on 24 December 1996.

Latasi Cabinet (1993-1996)

The general election was held on 2 September 1993. In the subsequent parliament the members were evenly split in their support of the incumbent prime minister Bikenibeu Paeniu and the former prime minister Tomasi Puapua.

As a consequence, the governor-general, Sir Toaripi Lauti, dissolved the parliament on 22 September and a further election took place on 25 November 1993. The subsequent parliament elected Kamuta Latasi as prime minister on 10 December 1993, with a 7:5 majority over the group a members of parliament headed by former prime minister Bikenibeu Paeniu. The deputy prime minister was Otinielu Tausi. Alesana Seluka was appointed the minister of finance (1996–1999) Kamuta Latasi ceased to be the prime minister as the result of a vote of no confidence on 24 December 1996. 
The members of the cabinet included:

Cabinets 1977-1993

1st Paeniu Cabinet (1989-1993)

Following the 1989 general election Bikenibeu Paeniu was subsequently elected as prime minister, with a five-member cabinet formed on 16 October 1989.
The members of the cabinet were:

2nd Puapua Cabinet (1985-1989)

The general election was held on 12 September 1985, with nine members re-elected including prime minister Tomasi Puapua and finance minister Henry Naisali. On 21 September, Tomasi Puapua was re-elected as prime minister; he subsequently appointed a five-member cabinet.   Henry Naisali resigned his seat to take up the position of Secretary General of the South Pacific Forum in September 1988.  Kitiseni Lopati, was appointed at the minister of finance and commerce to replaced Naisali.
The members of the cabinet were:

1st Puapua Cabinet (1981-1985)

The first elections after independence were not held until 8 September 1981. Dr. Tomasi Puapua, was elected as prime minister with a 7:5 majority over the group a members of parliament headed by former prime minister Toaripi Lauti. Henry Naisali, former civil servant, was appointed to cabinet as minister of finance and commerce. 
The members of the cabinet were:

Lauti Cabinet (1977-1981)

Following the result of the 1974 Ellice Islands self-determination referendum, the Tuvaluan Order 1975, which took effect on 1 October 1975, recognised Tuvalu as a separate British dependency with its own government.

Elections to the House of Assembly of the British Colony of Tuvalu were held on 27 August 1977; with Toaripi Lauti being appointed Chief Minister in the House of Assembly of the Colony of Tuvalu on 1 October 1977. The House of Assembly was dissolved in July 1978 with the government of Toaripi Lauti continuing as a caretaker government until the 1981 elections were held. Toaripi Lauti became the first prime minister of the Parliament of Tuvalu or Palamene o Tuvalu on 1 October 1978 when Tuvalu became an independent nation.

The members of the cabinet were:

References

Cabinet
Tuvalu